The Senate Commerce Subcommittee on Surface Transportation, Maritime, Freight, and Ports is a subcommittee within the Senate Committee on Commerce, Science and Transportation. It was known in previous Congresses as the Subcommittee on Transportation and Safety.

Jurisdiction
The Subcommittee on Transportation and Safety has jurisdiction over interstate transportation policy issues. In addition to the committee's broad oversight of the Department of Transportation, the subcommittee has oversight over the Federal Motor Carrier Safety Administration, the Federal Railroad Administration, the Pipeline and Hazardous Materials Safety Administration, National Transportation Safety Board, National Highway Traffic Safety Administration, and the Surface Transportation Board. The subcommittee focuses on safety and infrastructure development related to both freight and passenger rail, including Amtrak.

Members, 118th Congress

Historical subcommittee rosters

117th Congress

116th Congress

External links
Committee on Commerce, Science and Transportation website, Subcommittee page

Economy of the United States
Commerce Surface